Mandya is a 2006 Indian Kannada-language action drama film produced and directed by Om Prakash Rao and written by Purushottam Rao. The film stars Darshan, Radhika and Rakshita in the lead roles. The film is a remake of Telugu film Samba (2004).

Cast

 Darshan as Ganesh alias Eshwar
 Rakshita as Paaru
 Diganth
 Radhika as Ganga
 Swasthik Shankar
 Dharma
 Ravi Chetan
 Harish Rai
 Sadhu Kokila
 Anantha Velu
 Chitra Shenoy
 Malathi Sardeshpande
 G. V. Sudhakar
 Shobharaj
 Amulya

Soundtrack
The music of the film was composed by Gurukiran.

Reception 
A critic from The Hindu wrote that "But in Mandya, he [Om Prakash Rao] staggers continuously and loses grip of the storyline. Thus he remains a stranger to both what he wants to convey and what he conveys". A critic from Rediff.com wrote that the film "fails to generate interest among the viewers because of a weak script".

References

2006 films
2000s Kannada-language films
2006 action drama films
Indian action drama films
Kannada remakes of Telugu films
Films scored by Gurukiran
Films directed by Om Prakash Rao
2000s masala films

kn:ಮಂಡ್ಯ